This is a list of flags of Hong Kong.

Official flag

Police flags

Corrections Service Department flags

Customs and Excise Department flags

Fire Services Department flags

Immigration Department flags

Medical Service flags

Civil Aid Service flags

Vexillology Association flags

Political flags

Hong Kong protest flags

Historical flags

Governor of Hong Kong

Royal Hong Kong Regiment

Proposed flags

Hong Kong shipping companies

See also
List of Macanese flags

References

Flags
Lists and galleries of flags